WGI may refer to:

 Winter Guard International, an organization for pageantry and performing arts
 Worldwide Governance Indicators, an index built by the World Bank to evaluate country governance
 World Governance Index, index developed in 2008 by Forum for a new World Governance
 WGI (radio station), an early commercial radio station in Medford Hillside, Massachusetts
 Watkins Glen International, a racetrack in western New York State
 World Giving Index, an annual report published by the Charities Aid Foundation